Rainham School for Girls is an 11–18 girls, secondary school and sixth form with academy status in Rainham, Gillingham, Kent, England. It is next to the all-boys school, The Howard School and is a Technology College.

History
It was previously a community school administered by Medway Council; the school converted to academy status on 1 March 2011.

Before it converted Ofsted described it as a larger than average secondary school, and a non-selective school in a selective area. It became a technology college in 1996. There were a higher than average number of students with special needs, but fewer with SEN statements.

Ofsted found a school that pupils enjoyed and met with parental aspirations, that they deemed satisfactory/ They found good safeguarding, good behaviour and a good focused curriculum. They were critical that in spite of effective action by the staff, external examination results were below the national average, and the pupils were consistently underachieving.

Governance
Managed by The Kemnal Academies Trust, a large multi-academy trust with 45 schools under its wing. 15 are secondary and 30 primary.

Academics
In 2016, Ofsted rated this as a good school. It now recognises that pupils enter the school with below average levels of achievement, but counting in all their examinations, by the end of Year 11, their outcomes are above national averages. Pupils want to learn, and have good relations with the staff. The staff are knowledgeable and prepare appropriate interesting lessons.

Sport
The school is also the home to the Medway Netball League and Junior Netball League. Its large netball centre has eight floodlit courts (which are also suitable for tennis).
In 2013, the school football team reached the final of the Npower Football League Girls Cup in Wembley Stadium. They played against a Derby County school.

The school also offers lettings to external businesses - such as pilates classes for adults - after school hours.

References

External links 
 

Gillingham, Kent
Secondary schools in Medway
Academies in Medway
Girls' schools in Kent